Kapıdağ Peninsula is a peninsula in southwestern Anatolia extending into the Mediterranean Sea in Muğla Province, Turkey, terminating in Cape Kurdoğlu. The peninsula forms the Gulf of Fethiye on its east. The peninsula was the site of the ancient town of Lydae.

References

Peninsulas of Turkey
Landforms of Muğla Province